Casiano Wilberto Delvalle Ruiz (born 13 August 1970) is a former association football player from Paraguay who played as a striker.

Throughout his career he played for several Paraguayan and Asian teams, most specifically from China and Japan. Delvalle was called for the Paraguay national football team during 1995 for some matches, most of them, friendlies.

Highlights of his career include winning the Chinese Football Association Golden Boot in 2000 and being the top-scorer in the 2005 Paraguayan Paraguayan second division while playing for Sport Colombia.

Honours
Olimpia Asunción
Primera División: 1997

Beijing Guoan
Chinese FA Cup: 1997, 2003

Notes

References

External links

1970 births
Living people
Paraguayan footballers
Paraguayan expatriate footballers
Paraguay international footballers
Sportivo Luqueño players
Sport Colombia footballers
Club Atlético 3 de Febrero players
Cerro Corá footballers
Club Olimpia footballers
Unión Española footballers
Chilean Primera División players
Beijing Guoan F.C. players
Shandong Taishan F.C. players
J2 League players
Shonan Bellmare players
Guangzhou F.C. players
Expatriate footballers in Chile
Paraguayan expatriate sportspeople in Chile
Expatriate footballers in China
Paraguayan expatriate sportspeople in China
Expatriate footballers in Japan
Paraguayan expatriate sportspeople in Japan
Association football forwards